This is a list of county courthouses in the U.S. state of Missouri.  Each county in Missouri has a city that is the county seat where the county government resides, including a county courthouse.

Federal courthouses in Missouri are not listed here.

See also
 List of courthouses in the United States
 List of United States federal courthouses in Missouri

Further reading

References

 
 
County Courthouses
Missouri